2,2′-Biphenol is an organic compound with the formula (C6H4OH)2.  It is one of three symmetrical isomers of biphenol.  A white solid, it is a precursor to diphosphite ligands that are used to support industrial hydroformylation catalysis.

Synthesis
The chemical can be made by a hydrolysis reaction that opens the central ring of dibenzofuran.  Alternatively, it can be produced from 2,4-di-tert-butylphenol in two steps.  The first step entails oxidative coupling to give the 2,2′-biphenol with four tert-butyl substituents.  This species then undergoes debutylation.

See also
 1,1′-Bi-2-naphthol

References

Phenols
Biphenyls